The Maltese honey bee, Apis mellifera ruttneri, is a subspecies of the western honey bee, endemic to the Maltese islands which are situated in the Mediterranean Sea.

Origin 
The A. m. ruttneri evolved into a distinct subspecies when the Maltese islands were cut off from Sicily at the end of the last ice age, belonging to the A Lineage of Apis mellifera and therefore being more closely related to African lineage rather than to the European C Lineage. The production of honey by the Maltese bee has likely contributed to the islands name as the ancient Greeks called the island  (Melitē) meaning "honey-sweet".

Character and behaviour 

The bee is of relatively dark colour and has shown an ability to defend itself against local predacious wasps, a behavior also reported in the related A. m. sicula, but not observed in imported A. m. ligustica bees. It was also observed to abscond during times of dearth and produce large numbers of queen cells prior to swarming (up to 80).

In a comparison study on the island of Malta against the A. m. ligustica, the A. m. ruttneri showed significantly greater tolerance (all the A. m. ruttneri hives were still alive after 23 months, while all the A. m. ligustica hives died within a year) and resistance (by measuring the Hygienic trait with a Pin Test, the A. m. ruttneri had 50% higher results) towards the Varroa destructor mite. Also the A. m. ruttneri produced over three times the yield of honey when compared to the A. m. ligustica bees during the late season. However the A. m. ruttneri was observed to be more aggressive and less calm on the comb during inspections, and they appeared to continue to rear brood and maintain a higher population during the winters months on Malta.

History of A. m. ruttneri 
The subspecies is named after Professor Friedrich Ruttner, an expert in honey bee queen breeding and also in the intra-specific taxonomy of the Apis mellifera. It is considered as making a comeback after Varroa was introduced to Malta in the early 1990's. At that time colonies of bees from abroad were imported to compensate for the loss of colonies. In 1997 it was confirmed as a distinct subspecies through DNA analysis, previously morphometric wing analysis had been used. In 2022, it was reported that 70% of the Maltese colonies were destroyed by the Oriental hornet.

Foundation for the Conservation of the Maltese Honey Bee 

In 2022 a foundation was set up to help in the conservation and promotion of the A. m. ruttneri. The organization aims for the A. m. ruttneri to be recognized in terms of Malta's "national ecology" and "natural heritage": To encourage research and breeding, and to co-ordinate various entities interested in the Maltese honeybee’s conservation, as well as "To emphasise the importance of legislation that would protect the Maltese Honeybee in a holistic way". They oppose the importation of other bees into Malta stating that the "Maltese bee (A. m. ruttneri) is being polluted by honey bees of foreign breeds being imported into our country". They have published a document indicating the benefits of rearing the local bee versus foreign ones and in summer 2023 they shall publish a legal paper regarding the Maltese and European laws related to the genetic protection of the endemic Maltese honey bee.

References 

Western honey bee breeds
Fauna of Malta